These are the Canadian number-one albums of 1993. The chart was compiled and published by RPM every Saturday.

References

See also
 1993 in music
 RPM number-one hits of 1993

1993
1993 record charts
1993 in Canadian music